Milward may refer to:

Given name 
Milward Kennedy (1894–1968), English civil servant, journalist, crime writer and literary critic
Milward Simpson (1897– 1993), American politician

Surname 
Alan Milward (1935–2010), British economic historian
Alfred Milward (1870–1941), British professional footballer 
Edward Milward (1712?–1757), English physician and historian of medicine
Evan Milward (born 1984), Canadian former soccer player
Gregory Milward (born 1985), British radio DJ, television presenter and author
John Freeman Milward Dovaston (1782–1854), British poet and naturalist
Malcolm Milward (born 1948), English cricketer
Peter Milward (1925–2017), British Jesuit priest and literary scholar
Richard Milward (born 1984), English novelist
Simon Milward (1965–2005), General Secretary of the Federation of European Motorcyclists Associations
Victor Milward (1840–1901), British politician

See also
Henry Milward & Sons, is an English manufacturer
Tasker Milward Voluntary Controlled School, secondary school in Haverfordwest, Pembrokeshire, South West Wales
Millward (disambiguation)

Occupational surnames